Petersen Vargas is a Filipino filmmaker. He is best known for directing the Cinema One Originals Best Picture winner 2 Cool 2 Be 4gotten (2016) and the web series Hello Stranger (2020).

Early life and education
Vargas was born and raised in Pampanga, Philippines. Coming from a family of lawyers, he majored in Political Science at the University of the Philippines Diliman, but eventually switched to film after one year. As a student in university Vargas's work in short films had attracted buzz among his peers and local indie movie enthusiasts. He graduated cum laude from the University of the Philippines Film Institute in 2014.

Career
Vargas first received notice with his short film Lisyun qng Geografia, which won the Best Direction award at the 11th Cinemalaya Independent Film Festival in 2015. The following year, at the age of 24, Vargas directed his debut feature 2 Cool 2 Be 4gotten (2016), which was written by fellow Kampampagan filmmaker Jason Paul Laxamana. The film starred Khalil Ramos, Ethan Salvador, and was the film debut of Jameson Blake. The film premiered at the Cinema One Originals film festival, where it won Best Picture, Best Cinematography, and Best Supporting Actor (for Blake).

In January 2019 Vargas was selected to be a part of the  Southeast Asia Fiction Film Lab (SEAFIC), a script and development lab for Southeast Asian filmmakers. He would go on to win the lab's grand prize, the SEAFIC Award. The prize will go towards the production of Vargas's second feature, a road movie tentatively titled Some Nights I Feel Like Walking, to be produced by Alemberg Ang and Jade Castro. The film was also selected to be a part of the Locarno Film Festival's Open Doors Hub. Later in the year, the Vargas-directed music video of Nadine Lustre's single St4y Up won Music Video of the Year at the Myx Music Awards 2019.

In 2020, Vargas directed the web series Hello Stranger, starring Tony Labrusca and JC Alcantara. In the same year, Some Nights I Feel Like Walking was selected to be a part of the 16th edition of the Cinéfondation's Atelier, a program under the auspices of the Cannes Film Festival which aims to encourage a new generation of filmmakers. Vargas also directed the short film How to Die Young in Manila (2020), which was spun off from his yet to be released second feature. The film had its world premiere at the  25th Busan International Film Festival and was later screened at the Singapore International Film Festival.

Aside from his work directing films, Vargas has also directed music videos, commercials, and has been a creative producer for the movie production company T-Rex Entertainment.

Filmography

Feature films

Short films

Digital series

Music videos

References

External links 

Living people
Filipino film directors
Filipino television directors
ABS-CBN people
Year of birth missing (living people)
People from Pampanga
University of the Philippines alumni
Artists from Pampanga